Charles H. Dager (May 10, 1927 – January 26, 2016) is a former Republican member of the Pennsylvania House of Representatives.

References

Republican Party members of the Pennsylvania House of Representatives
1927 births
2016 deaths